The Haag Nunataks in Antarctica are a group of three low elevations aligned nearly north–south. The dominant central nunatak and the southern elevation have definite rock exposures; the minor northern elevation may be entirely snow-covered. The feature was discovered by the Ronne Antarctic Research Expedition (1947–48), led by Finn Ronne, who named it "Mount Haag" for Joseph Haag, head of Todd Shipyards, New York City, which worked on the expedition ship. Aerial photographs obtained by U.S. Navy Squadron VX-6 in 1966 show the feature to be a group of nunataks, not a mountain, and the name was amended accordingly by the Advisory Committee on Antarctic Names.

References

Nunataks of Palmer Land